A wind god is a god who controls the wind(s). Air deities may also be considered here as wind is nothing more than moving air. Many polytheistic religions have one or more wind gods. They may also have a separate air god or a wind god may double as an air god. Sometimes even a water god. Many wind gods are also linked with one of the 4 seasons.

Africa

Egyptian  
Amun, god of creation and the wind.
Henkhisesui, god of the east wind.
Ḥutchai, god of the west wind.
Qebui, god of the north wind who appears as a man with four ram heads or a winged ram with four heads.
Shehbui, god of the south wind.
Shu, god of the air.

Western Eurasia

Albanian 
Shurdhi, weather god who causes hailstorms and throws thunder and lightning.
Verbti, weather god who causes hailstorms and controls the water and the northern wind.

Balto-Slavic

Lithuanian  
Vejopatis, god of the wind according to at least one tradition.

Slavic  
Dogoda is the goddess of the west wind, and of love and gentleness.
Stribog is the name of the Slavic god of winds, sky and air. He is said to be the ancestor (grandfather) of the winds of the eight directions.
 Moryana is the personification of the cold and harsh wind blowing from the sea to the land, as well as the water spirit. 
Varpulis is the companion of the thunder god Perun who was known in Central Europe and Lithuania.

Basque 
 Egoi, god of the south wind.

Celtic 
Sídhe or Aos Sí were the pantheon of pre-Christian Ireland. Sídhe is usually taken as "fairy folk", but it is also Old Irish for wind or gust.
Borrum, Celtic god of the winds.

Norse-Germanic 
Kári, son of Fornjót and brother to Ægir and Logi, god of wind, apparently as its personification, much like his brothers personify sea and fire.
Njord, god of the wind, especially as it concerns sailors.
Odin, thought by some scholars to be a god of the air/breath.

Greco-Roman 

 Aeolus, keeper of the winds; later writers made him a full-fledged god.
 Anemoi, (in Greek, Ἄνεμοι—"winds") were the Greek wind gods.
 Boreas (Βορράς), god of the north wind and of winter.
 Eurus (Έβρος), god of the east or southeast wind.
 Notus (Νότος), god of the south wind.
 Zephyrus (Ζέφυρος), god of the west wind.
 Aparctias, another name for the north wind (not identified with Boreas).
 Apheliotes, god of the east wind (when Eurus is considered southeast).
 Argestes, another name for the west or northwest wind.
 Caicias (Καικιας), god of the northeast wind.
 Circios or Thraskias, god of the north-northwest wind.
 Euronotus (Εβρονοτος), god of the southeast wind.
 Lips (Λίψ), god of the southwest wind.
 Skeiron, god of the northwest wind.
 Leuconotus (Λιβονοτος), god of south-southwest wind.
 Aura, the breeze personified.
 Aurai, nymphs of the breeze.
 Cardea, Roman goddess of health, thresholds, door hinges, and handles; associated with the wind.
 Venti, (Latin, "winds") deities equivalent to the Greek Anemoi.

Western Asia

Persian Zoroastarian 
Vayu-Vata, two gods often paired together; the former was the god of wind and the latter was the god of the atmosphere/air.

Mesopotamian  
Enlil, the Sumerian god of air, wind, breath, loft.
Ninlil, goddess of the wind and consort of Enlil.
Pazuzu, king of the wind demons, demon of the southwest wind, and son of the god Hanbi.

Uralic

Finnish 
 Ilmarinen, blacksmith and god of the wind, weather and air.
 Tuuletar, goddess or spirit of the wind.

Hungarian 
Szélatya, the Hungarian god of wind.
Szélanya, the Hungarian goddess of wind and daughter of the primordial god Kayra.
Zada, keeper of the precious Yada Tashy stone.

Sami 
Bieggolmai, unpredictable shovel-wielding god of the summer winds.
Biegkegaellies, god of the winter winds.

Asia-Pacific / Oceania

South and East Asia

India 
 Vayu, god of the winds and air.
 Rudra, Vedic god of storms, winds, and the hunt.
 Svasti, consort of Vayu and shakti or power that of Vayu.

Hindu-Vedic 
Maruts, attendants of Indra, sometimes the same as the below group of gods.
Rudra, wind or storm god.
Rudras, followers of Rudra.
Vayu, god of wind.

Chinese 
Fei Lian, the Chinese wind god; Feng Bo is the human form of Fei Lian.
Feng Po Po, the Chinese wind goddess.
 Feng Closa, general of the wind.
 Han Zixian, assistant goddess of the wind.

Japanese 
Fūjin, the wind god.
Shinatsuhiko, god of the winds.
Susanoo, the god of storms.

Korean 
Yondung Halmoni, goddess revered by farmers and sailors.

Vietnamese 
Thần Gió, the wind god.

Austronesia

Philippine 
Amihan, the Tagalog and Visayan goddess of the northeast winds. She is also known as Alunsina.
Anitun Tabu, the fickle-minded ancient Tagalog goddess of wind and rain.
Apo Angin, the Ilocano god of wind. 
Buhawi, the Tagalog god of whirlwinds and hurricanes' arcs. He is the enemy of Habagat.
Habagat, the Tagalog god of winds and also referred to as the god of rain, and is often associated with the rainy season. He rules the kingdom of silver and gold in the sky, or the whole Himpapawirin (atmosphere).
Lihangin, the Visayan god of the wind.
Linamin at Barat, the goddess of monsoon winds in Palawan.
San Gabriel, the god of the wind of Caloocan.
Renzo At Rad, the eyes of the wind in Caloocan.

Polynesian

Hawaiian 
Hine-Tu-Whenua, Hawaiian goddess of wind and safe journeys.
La'a Maomao, Hawaiian god of the wind and forgiveness.
Pakaa, Hawaiian god of the wind and inventor of the sail.

Winds of Māui 
The Polynesian trickster hero Māui captured or attempted to capture many winds during his travels.
Fisaga, the gentle breeze, the only wind that Māui failed to capture
Mata Upola, the east wind.
Matuu, the north wind.

Māori 
Hanui-o-Rangi.
Tāwhirimātea, Māori god of weather, including thunder and lightning, wind, clouds, and storms.

Native American

North America

Anishinaabe 
 Epigishmog, god of the west wind and spiritual being of ultimate destiny.

Cherokee 
 Oonawieh Unggi, the ancient spirit of the wind.

Iroquois 
 Da-jo-jo, mighty panther spirit of the west wind.
 Gǎ-oh, spirit of the wind.
 Ne-o-gah, cam dubs gentle fawn spirit of the south wind.
 O-yan-do-ne, moose spirit of the east wind.
 Ya-o-gah, destructive bear spirit of the north wind who is stopped by Gǎ-oh.

Inuit 
 Silap Inua, the weather god who represents the breath of life and lures children to be lost in the tundra.

Lakota 
 Okaga, fertility goddess of the south winds.
 Taku Skanskan, capricious master of the four winds.
 Tate, a wind god or spirit in Lakota mythology.
 Waziya, giant of the north winds who brings icy weather, famine, and diseases.
 Wiyohipeyata, god of the west winds who oversees endings and events of the night.
 Wiyohiyanpa, god of the east winds who oversees beginnings and events of the day.
 Yum, the whirlwind son of Anog Ite.

Navajo 
 Niltsi, ally of the Heroic Twins and one of the guardians of the sun gods.

Pawnee 
 Hotoru, the giver of breath invoked in religious ceremonies.

Central American and the Caribbean

Aztec 

 Cihuatecayotl, god of the west wind.
 Ehecatotontli, gods of the breezes.
 Ehecatl, god of wind.
 Mictlanpachecatl, god of the north wind.
 Tezcatlipoca, god of the night wind and hurricanes.
 Tlalocayotl, god of the east wind.
 Vitztlampaehecatl, god of the south wind.

Mayan 
 Hurácan, K'iche' Maya creator god of the winds, storms and fire.
 Pauahtuns, wind deities associated with the Bacab and Chaac.

Taino 
 Guabancex, goddess of the wind and hurricanes.

South America

Quechua 
 Huayra-tata, god of the winds.

Brazil 
 Iansã / Oyá, goddess of the winds.

See also
Sky god
Weather god

References

Wind deities